This is an overview of the progression of the Paralympic track cycling record of the women's 500 m time trial as recognised by the Union Cycliste Internationale (UCI) and IPC.

C5 Progression

C4 Progression

C3 Progression

C2 Progression

C1 Progression

References

Track cycling Olympic record progressions